Matthew 9:8 is the eighth verse in the ninth chapter of the Gospel of Matthew in the New Testament.

Content
In the original Greek according to Textus Receptus and Byzantine Majority, this verse is:
ἰδόντες δὲ οἱ ὄχλοι ἐθαύμασαν, καὶ ἐδόξασαν τὸν θεὸν τὸν δόντα ἐξουσίαν τοιαύτην τοῖς ἀνθρώποις 

According to Westcott-Hort, the Greek text of this verse is:
Ἰδόντες δὲ οἱ ὄχλοι ἐφοβήθησαν καὶ ἐδόξασαν τὸν θεὸν τὸν δόντα ἐξουσίαν τοιαύτην τοῖς ἀνθρώποις.

In the King James Version of the Bible the text reads:
But when the multitudes saw it, they marvelled, and glorified God, which had given such power unto men.

The Holman Christian Standard Bible translates the passage as:
When the crowds saw this, they were awestruck and gave glory to God who had given such authority to men.

For a collection of other versions see BibleHub Matthew 9:8.

Analysis
This verse records the reaction of the people who witnessed the miraculous healing of a paralytic man by Jesus, who before the healing declared the forgiveness of the man's sins, that they glorified God, who had given such divine "power" or "authority" to men. Dale Allison notes that a text in 4QPrNab, a document among the Dead Sea Scrolls, shows that some Jews think of one person who forgives another's sins with healing as the result.

The Greek text according to Westcott and Hort has  ("they were afraid"; cf.  for a similar reaction of fear at miraculous events), a rather solely physical effect than the word  ("they marvelled") of the Textus Receptus, which is more in agreement with words used in the parallel verses, Mark 2  ("they all were amazed") and Luke 5  ("they all were filled with fear"). Moreover, Mark 2:12 records the words the people said, “We never saw it after this fashion", whereas Luke 5:26 has "We saw strange things today". The variants of words here and in the parallel verses are likely attributed to various translations of the Aramaic or Hebrew traditions.

The event described here took place in Capernaum, where Jesus resided at the time (cf. Matthew 4:13).

References

Sources

09:08